Ashutosh Tandon (born 12 May 1960), also known as Gopal Tandon, is an Indian politician and currently serving as Minister of Urban Development, Overall Urban Development, Urban Employment and Poverty Alleviation in the Government of Uttar Pradesh. Tandon was also a member of the Uttar Pradesh Legislative Assembly from the Lucknow East constituency in Lucknow district. He is son of BJP's senior leader and former Governor of Madhya Pradesh Lal Ji Tandon.

Personal life
Tandon was born on 12 May 1960 to politician Lalji Tandon in Lucknow, Uttar Pradesh, in a Hindu Khatri family. He graduated with a Bachelor of Arts degree from Lucknow University in 1980. He married Madhu Tandon on 6 May 1982, with whom he has a daughter.

Career
Ashutosh Tandon was appointed Director of Union Bank of India from 2001 - 2006 

In 2014, Tandon defeated Juhie Singh by 26,459 votes for the Lucknow East assembly seat.

In 2017, Ashutosh Tandon defeated SP-Congress joint candidate Anurag Bhadoria by record 79,230 votes. Tandon was appointed to the ministries of Technical and Medical Education.

In a portfolio reshuffle in August 2019, Tandon was allocated Urban Development Department.

In 2022 Uttar Pradesh Legislative Assembly election, Tandon won for the third time from Lucknow East constituency, defeating Samajwadi Party's Anurag Bhadouria by 49017 votes.

See also
 Yogi Adityanath ministry (2017–)

References 

1960 births
Living people
Politicians from Lucknow
Bharatiya Janata Party politicians from Uttar Pradesh
State cabinet ministers of Uttar Pradesh
Yogi ministry
Uttar Pradesh MLAs 2017–2022
Uttar Pradesh MLAs 2022–2027